Polokwane International Airport , is an airport serving the city of Polokwane (known until 2005 as Pietersburg) in the South African province of Limpopo. The airport is located 5 km north of the city. It is not to be confused with the nearby Pietersburg Civil Aerodrome .

Overview
It opened in March 1996 on the site of a former air force base (which had the ICAO code FAPB). It was formerly known as "Gateway International Airport". It is owned by Gateway Airports Authority Limited, owned by the Limpopo Provincial Government to manage all public airports in Limpopo.

In April 2021 the South African Civil Aviation Authority downgraded the airport's license category due to inadequate provision of safety services for scheduled commercial flights. Consequently Airlink suspended their flights. The airport has scheduled flights to Johannesburg, with five flights on weekdays, one flight on Saturday and two on Sunday. As of 2010, it handled approximately 8,000 aircraft and 58,700 passengers per year.

Airlines and destinations

References

External links 
 
 
 

Airports in South Africa
Polokwane
Buildings and structures in Limpopo
Transport in Limpopo
Airports established in 1996